The George and Nancy Turner House is a historic house in Fremont, Nebraska. The two-story brick house was built in 1860 for homesteader George Turner and his wife Nancy. It was designed in the Italianate architectural style. George Turner died in 1870, and his widow expanded the rear of the house in 1874. The entrance was redesigned in the Queen Anne style in 1889–1891. The house remained in the Turner family until 1980. It has been listed on the National Register of Historic Places since January 11, 1996.

References

National Register of Historic Places in Dodge County, Nebraska
Italianate architecture in Nebraska
Houses completed in 1868
1868 establishments in Nebraska